Sena Paribar Kalyan Samity (soldiers family welfare society) is a Bangladeshi non-profit operated by Bangladesh Army and managed by wives of senior military officers. The wife of the Bangladesh Army chief leads the organization.

History 
Sena Paribar Kalyan Samity was established in 1975 with Rowshan Ershad, wife of General Hussain Mohammad Ershad, as its founding president.

Sena Paribar Kalyan Samity established Sena Shahayok School in July 2007. It was led by Begum Nazneen Moeen, wife of Moeen U Ahmed who was the chief of Army Staff of Bangladesh Army. She distributed awards for students of Shaheed Bir Uttam Lt Anwar Girls College.

On 29 April 2015, Prime Minister Sheikh Hasina inaugurated the headquarters of Sena Paribar Kalyan Samity called Surjyakanya in Dhaka Cantonment.

The Cox's Khagrachari District unit of Sena Paribar Kalyan Samity in January 2019 distributed clothing for poor people in the area led by the local unit president Fahmida Sajed. She is the wife of Brigadier General A.K.M. Sajedul Islam 24th Artillery Brigade based in the Guimara Upazila. The Rangamati District unit also distributed winter clothes.

The Cox's Bazar District unit of Sena Paribar Kalyan Samity distributed warm clothes for 400 people in Ramu Upazila. The Cox's Bazar District unit of Sena Paribar Kalyan Samity organized a free medical clinic for pregnant women in June 2020 and painting competition in September 2020 on the occasion of the 100th birthday of former President Sheikh Mujibur Rahman. The Cox's Bazar District Unit is attached to the 10th Infantry Division of Bangladesh Army out of Ramu Cantonment. The President of the unit, Sharmin Main, is the wife of the General Officer Commanding of the 10th Infantry Division, Major General Fakhrul Ahsan.

In August 2021, Sena Paribar Kalyan Samity and the Dhaka Cantonment Ladies Club distributed relief materials for poor people whose income was affected by the COVID-19 pandemic in Bangladesh in the residential area of Dhaka Cantonment. It was led by President Nurjahan Ahmed, wife of General SM Shafiuddin Ahmed, the chief of Army Staff of Bangladesh Army.

See also 

 Bangladesh Army Welfare Trust
 Sena Kalyan Sangstha

References 

Military of Bangladesh
Government agencies of Bangladesh
Organisations based in Dhaka

Government agencies established in 1975
1975 establishments in Bangladesh